Porcelain crabs are decapod crustaceans in the widespread family Porcellanidae, which superficially resemble true crabs. They have flattened bodies as an adaptation for living in rock crevices. They are delicate, readily losing limbs when attacked, and use their large claws for maintaining territories. They first appeared in the Tithonian age of the Late Jurassic epoch, 145–152 million years ago.

Description
They share the general body plan of a squat lobster, but their bodies are more compact and flattened, an adaptation for living and hiding under rocks. Porcelain crabs are quite fragile animals, and  often shed their limbs to escape predators, hence their name. The lost appendage can grow back over several moults. Porcelain crabs have large chelae (claws), which are used for territorial struggles, but not for catching food. The fifth pair of pereiopods is reduced and used for cleaning.

Evolution
Porcelain crabs are an example of carcinisation, whereby a noncrab-like animal (in this case a relative of a squat lobster) evolves into an animal that resembles a true crab. Porcelain crabs can be distinguished from true crabs by the apparent number of walking legs (three instead of four pairs; the fourth pair is reduced and held against the carapace), and the long antennae originating on the front outside of the eyestalks. The abdomen of the porcelain crab is long and folded underneath it, free to move.

Biogeography and ecology

Porcelain crabs live in all the world's oceans, except the Arctic Ocean and the Antarctic. They are common under rocks, and can often be found and observed on rocky beaches and shorelines, startled creatures scurrying away when a stone is lifted. They feed by combing plankton and other organic particles from the water using long setae (feathery hair- or bristle-like structures) on the mouthparts.

Some of the common species of porcelain crabs in the Caribbean Sea are Petrolisthes quadratus, found in large numbers under rocks in the intertidal, and the red-and-white polka-dotted Porcellana sayana, which lives commensally within the shells inhabited by large hermit crabs. In Hong Kong, Petrolisthes japonicus is common.

Diversity
, some 4723 extant species of porcelain crab had been described, divided among these 30 genera:

Aliaporcellana Nakasone & Miyake, 1969
Allopetrolisthes Haig, 1960
Ancylocheles Haig, 1978
Capilliporcellana Haig, 1978
Clastotoechus Haig, 1960
Enosteoides Johnson, 1970
Euceramus Stimpson, 1860
Eulenaios Ng & Nakasone, 1993
Heteropolyonyx Osawa, 2001
Heteroporcellana Haig, 1978
Liopetrolisthes Haig, 1960
Lissoporcellana Haig, 1978
Madarateuchus Harvey, 1999
Megalobrachium Stimpson, 1858
Minyocerus Stimpson, 1858
Neopetrolisthes Miyake, 1937
Neopisosoma Haig, 1960
Novorostrum Osawa, 1998
Orthochela Glassell, 1936
Pachycheles Stimpson, 1858
Parapetrolisthes Haig, 1962
Petrocheles Miers, 1876
Petrolisthes Stimpson, 1858
Pisidia Leach, 1820
Polyonyx Stimpson, 1858
Porcellana Lamarck, 1801
Porcellanella White, 1852
Pseudoporcellanella Sankarankutty, 1962
Raphidopus Stimpson, 1858
Ulloaia Glassell, 1938

The fossil record of porcelain crabs includes species of Pachycheles, Pisidia, Polyonyx, Porcellana, and a further six genera known only from fossils:
Annieporcellana Fraaije et al., 2008
Beripetrolisthes De Angeli & Garassino, 2002
Eopetrolisthes De Angeli & Garassino, 2002
Lobipetrolisthes De Angeli & Garassino, 2002
Longoporcellana Müller & Collins, 1991

The earliest claimed porcelain crab fossil was Jurellana from the Tithonian aged Ernstbrunn Limestone of Austria. However, it was subsequently determined to be a true crab. With the new oldest porcelain crab being Vibrissalana from the same locality.

References 

 
Anomura
Tithonian first appearances
Extant Late Jurassic first appearances
Taxa named by Adrian Hardy Haworth